Tu Xiao (born 19 August 1988) is a Chinese individual and synchronised trampoline gymnast, representing his nation at international competitions. He won the gold medal at the 2014 World Trampoline Gymnastics Championships in Sofia and silver medal in the 2014 Asian Games at Incheon, South Korea. In 2015, he ranked 2 in the Gymnastics - Trampoline World Ranking. He also competed at world championships, including at the 2015 Trampoline World Championships.

In 2017, he won the gold medal in Men's Synchro at  The World Games 2017 in Wrocław, Poland.

References

External links
 

1988 births
Living people
Chinese male trampolinists
Place of birth missing (living people)
World Games gold medalists
Competitors at the 2017 World Games
Medalists at the Trampoline Gymnastics World Championships
Asian Games medalists in gymnastics
Asian Games silver medalists for China
Gymnasts at the 2010 Asian Games
Gymnasts at the 2014 Asian Games
Medalists at the 2010 Asian Games
Medalists at the 2014 Asian Games
20th-century Chinese people
21st-century Chinese people